The MTV Australia Awards (previously known as the MTV Australia Video Music Awards or AVMA's) started in 2005 and were Australia's first awards show to celebrate both local and international acts. The last edition happened in 2009.

History
The MTV Australia Video Music Awards were announced in 2004 as the seventeenth country to host its own MTV award show with nominees being announced December that year. The show premiered on 3 March 2005 at Luna Park Sydney, Australia. It was hosted by The Osbournes with a number of guest stars, nominees, performers and presenters. The launch of the second AVMA (held at Acer Arena) was hosted by Ashlee Simpson. The third annual Australian Video Music Awards was held at Acer Arena, with hosts Fergie (from the Black Eyed Peas) and Good Charlotte, as well as MTV's Laguna Beach star, Kristin Cavallari. The MTV Mile High Gig made its debut in celebration of the launch of MTV New Zealand's Viewer's Choice which flew Kiwi fans via Air New Zealand to the awards show with live music guests on the plane. In 2008 the show's name was changed to MTV Australia Awards (or MTVAA's) and with it came a new format to the awards with the introduction of the categories Best Australian and New Zealand artist awards, Video of the Year, Good and Bad Karma Awards, Television moment, Live Performance award and Re-Make award, with the show being hosted by Wyclef Jean. The MTV New Zealand Mile High Gig made its return with Dizzee Rascal and Scribe headlining the event. In 2010 MTV Networks Australia announced it would launch MTV Classic. A music event will be held for the channel May launch and will replace the MTV awards show for the year.

Award locations
 3 March 2005 – Big Top Sydney hosted by The Osbournes
 12 April 2006 – Acer Arena, Sydney hosted by Ashlee Simpson
 29 April 2007 – Acer Arena, Sydney hosted by Fergie and Joel Madden and Benji Madden from Good Charlotte
 26 April 2008 – Australian Technology Park, Sydney hosted by Wyclef Jean
 27 March 2009 – Sydney Convention and Exhibition Centre, Darling Harbour, Sydney hosted by Pete Wentz

Award categories

Award winners

2005

 Best Male Artist: Shannon Noll
 Best Female Artist: Delta Goodrem
 Breakthrough Artist: Missy Higgins
 Best Group: Green Day
 Best Dance Video: Usher – Yeah!
 Best Pop Video: Guy Sebastian – Out with My Baby
 Best Rock Video: Green Day – American Idiot
 Best R&B Video: The Black Eyed Peas – Hey Mama
 Sexiest Video: The Black Eyed Peas – Hey Mama
 Best Dressed Video: Gwen Stefani – What You Waiting For?
 Video of the Year: The Dissociatives – Somewhere Down the Barrel
 Pepsi Viewers Choice: Delta Goodrem
 Supernova: Evermore
 VH1 Music First: Cher
 Free Your Mind: AusAID

2006

 Best Male Artist – Shannon Noll
 Best Female Artist – Ashlee Simpson
 Spankin' New Aussie Artist – The Veronicas
 Best Group – Green Day
 Best Dance Video – Rogue Traders – Voodoo Child
 Best Pop Video – Ashlee Simpson – Boyfriend
 Best Rock Video – The Darkness – One Way Ticket
 Best R&B Video – Chris Brown – Run It!
 Best Hip-Hop Video – Snoop Dogg – Drop It Like It's Hot
 Album of the Year – Bernard Fanning – Tea and Sympathy
 Song of the Year – James Blunt – You're Beautiful
 Video of the Year – The Veronicas – 4ever
 Viewers Choice – Anthony Callea
 Free Your Mind Award – Peter Garrett

2007

 Spankin' New Artist – Teddy Geiger – For You I Will (Confidence)
 Sexiest Video – Fergie – Fergalicious
 Best Pop Video – Guy Sebastian – Elevator Love
 Best Rock Video – Thirty Seconds to Mars – The Kill
 Best Male Artist – Shannon Noll – Lonely
 Best Female Artist – Pink – U + Ur Hand
 Best Group – Red Hot Chili Peppers
 Album of the Year – Evanescence – The Open Door
 Best Hip Hop Video – Snoop Dogg ft. R. Kelly – That's That
 Video of the Year – Thirty Seconds to Mars – The Kill
 Download of the Year – Pink – Who Knew
 Best Dance Video – Fedde le Grand – Put Your Hands Up 4 Detroit
 Best Hook Up – Justin Timberlake featuring Timbaland – SexyBack
 Viewers Choice Australia – Good Charlotte
 Viewers Choice New Zealand – Goodnight Nurse

2008

 Music Video of the Year – Delta Goodrem – Believe Again
 Australian Artist Music Award – The Veronicas
 New Zealand Artist Music Award – Scribe
 MTV Live Performer Award – Pink – I'm Not Dead Tour
 Television Moment Award – The Chaser's War on Everything – "APEC 2007 Stunt
 MTV Good Karma Award – Earth Hour – Engaging Australia and the world to act against climate change
 MTV Bad Karma Award – Kevin Andrews – For all of the above, especially the hair, and the Snoop Dogg thing
 Remake Award – Summer Heights High – Ja'mie's teary tirade
 Movie Star Award – Matt Damon
 Sport's Award – Mick Fanning
 International Music Artist of the Year – Timbaland

2009

 Best Collaboration – T.I. Feat. Rihanna – Live Your Life
 Best Rock Video – Fall Out Boy – I Don't Care
 Best Dance Video – The Ian Carey Project – Get Shaky
 Best Moves – Britney Spears – Circus
 Best Aussie – Jessica Mauboy
 Best Breakthrough – Katy Perry
 Best Kiwi – Nesian Mystik
 Independent Spirit – Sneaky Sound System
 Best Video – Pink – So What

Memorable moments

2007
 Award host and performer Snoop Dogg was denied entry into Australia.

2006
 Russell Crowe dropped his mic.
 Snoop Dogg was late to announce the Video of the Year.

2005
 Anna Nicole Smith bares her breasts when presenting the Video of the Year Award with Kelly Slater.
 Carmen Electra performs a strip tease for the audience.
 All the sound shut down during The Dissociatives performance.

Award themes
In 2005, There was a circus theme to go with the location at Luna Park Sydney. At the show they had a circus tent set up and when awards were given, clowns were shown doing things that related to the award (e.g. Best Group had clowns holding a net ready to catch the other clown jumping from a high place).

The theme for 2006 was the budgie smuggler. During the lead up to the show MTV Australia aired adverts where men would talk about their budgie smugglers and how they like to wear them and so on. The logo for the show however did not reflect this theme.

In 2007, the TV advertising campaign for the 2007 awards featured various singers and groups unrolling their own red carpets in different locations around Australia.
This year MTV Advert was about the focus on the Technology park with people with white costumes with a white helmet with cords and plugs on the helmet it was shot at the technology park where the event is going to be taken place.

See also
 MTV Award Shows
 MTV Australia
 Recipients of the MTV AVMA's New Zealand Choice Award
 News

References

External links
 MTV Australia
 Official MTVAA site

 
Awards established in 2005
Awards disestablished in 2010